Federal Route 9 or Karak–Tampin Highway (Malay: Jalan Karak–Tampin) is a federal road in Pahang and Negeri Sembilan, Malaysia. It connects Karak, Pahang in the north with Tampin, Negeri Sembilan in the south, running along the eastern edge of the Titiwangsa Mountains.

Features
At most sections, the Federal Route 9 was built under the JKR R5 road standard, with a speed limit of 90 km/h.

List of junctions and towns

References

Malaysian Federal Roads